Edward Reynolds Price (February 1, 1933 – January 20, 2011) was an American poet, novelist, dramatist, essayist and James B. Duke Professor of English at Duke University. Apart from English literature, Price had a lifelong interest in Biblical scholarship. He was a member of the American Academy of Arts and Letters.

Biography

Price was born Edward Reynolds Price in Macon, North Carolina, on February 1, 1933, the first of two sons of William Solomon and Elizabeth Price. Both he and his mother narrowly survived an extremely taxing childbirth; family legend states that during these circumstances, Will Price prayed and made a promise to God that if his wife and son survived, he would quit drinking alcohol.  Price's family, struggling under the economic climate of the Great Depression, resided in the rural North Carolina towns of Macon, Henderson, Warrenton, Roxboro, and Asheboro throughout his childhood. Rather than joining other boys his age in sports and outdoor activities, Price developed a childhood fondness for the arts – reading, writing, painting, and opera included.   He attended Broughton High School in Raleigh, North Carolina and eventually received a full scholarship to Duke University, where he continued writing, served as the editor of Duke's literary magazine, was elected to Phi Beta Kappa his junior year and graduated summa cum laude.  After graduating in 1955, Price received a Rhodes Scholarship and attended Merton College, Oxford.  While at Oxford, Price formed important friendships with the poet W. H. Auden and the biographer Lord David Cecil.  He devoted a significant portion of his literary studies, as well as his thesis, to English poet John Milton.   Upon graduation with a B.Litt. in 1958, Price secured a position in the Duke University English department, where he stayed for the rest of his career, often teaching courses on Milton, creative writing, and the Gospels.

In the spring of 1984, a life-altering medical event occurred when Price reported difficulty walking and underwent testing at Duke University Hospital.  James Schiff describes, "He soon learned of a 'pencil-thick and gray-colored' tumor, ten inches long and cancerous, which was 'intricately braided in the core of [his] spinal cord'."   Although surgery and radiation managed to remove the tumor from his spine, Price became a paraplegic and required a wheelchair for the rest of his life.  After enduring these initial years, Price emerged from this trying period "a more patient and watchful person and a dramatically more prolific writer." He still bore, however, "colossal, incessant pain", as he described. He wrote about his experience as a cancer survivor in his memoir A Whole New Life. Regarding his life after this tragedy, Price explains, "I'd have to say that, despite an enjoyable fifty-year start, these recent years since full catastrophe have gone still better.  They've brought more in and sent more out – more love and care, more knowledge and patience, more work in less time."

In 1987, Duke University gave Price its highest honor when it awarded him the University Medal for Distinguished Meritorious Service.

Price died at the age of 77 on January 20, 2011, as a result of complications from a heart attack.

Career

Over his career, Price produced 38 total novels, short stories, and memoirs.  Price is classified as a Southern writer, as his works are often especially associated with his lifelong home of North Carolina.  Price's first ever published story, called "A Chain of Love", came in 1958. He wrote his first novel, A Long and Happy Life, and witnessed its publication in 1962.  The work received the William Faulkner Foundation Award (1963) and has sold over a million copies. His 1986 novel Kate Vaiden also gained immense popularity and received the National Books Critics Circle Award.  Price composed a memoir entitled Clear Pictures in 1989 which directly led to the production of a Charles Guggenheim documentary about the author's lifetime.  He completed another memoir called A Whole New Life in 1994 which chronicled his journey after the discovery of cancer in his spine. The Collected Poems, containing four volumes of poetry – Vital Provisions (1982), The Laws of Ice (1986), The Use of Fire (1990), and The Unaccountable Worth of the World (1997) – was published in 1997.

Price entered the realm of pop culture with the release and Top-40 status of James Taylor's song "Copperline," which he and Taylor wrote together.  Bill Clinton characterized Price as one of his favorite authors.
  
On the cover of the December 6, 1999 issue of Time magazine, Price's name appeared.  Victor Strandberg explains, "Price's name was next to a Renaissance portrait of Jesus alongside a headline that reads, 'Novelist Reynolds Price offers a new Gospel based on archeology and the Bible.' Inside the magazine, this cover story begins with Time's statement that 'A great novelist and biblical scholar examines what faith and historical research tell us after 2,000 years and emerges with his own apocryphal Gospel'."

Personal life

Price lived alone, by choice, for all of his adult life and was openly homosexual. In 1957 he had an affair with the famous British poet Stephen Spender, visiting the Spender family home for Christmas.

Shortly after dawn on July 3, 1984, in the midst of treatment for his tumor, Price awoke in his bed and claimed to have had a life-changing mystic experience and vision in which he came in contact with Jesus Christ at the Sea of Galilee. Price gives an account of this occurrence in A Whole New Life:

It was the big lake of Kinnereth, the Sea of Galilee, in the north of Israel ... the scene of Jesus' first teaching and healing.  I'd paid the lake a second visit the previous October. ... Still sleeping around me on the misty ground were a number of men in the tunics and cloaks of first-century Palestine.  I soon understood with no sense of surprise that the men were Jesus' twelve disciples and that he was nearby asleep among them. ... Then one of the sleeping men woke and stood.  I saw it was Jesus, bound toward me. ... Again I felt no shock or fear.  All this was normal human event; it was utterly clear to my normal eyes and was happening as surely as any event of my previous life. ... Jesus bent and silently beckoned me to follow. ... Jesus silently took up handfuls of water and poured them over my head and back til water ran down my puckered scar.  Then he spoke once—"Your sins are forgiven"—and turned to shore again, done with me. I came on behind him, thinking in standard greedy fashion, It's not my sins I'm worried about. So to Jesus' receding back, I had the gall to say "Am I also cured?" He turned to face me, no sign of a smile, and finally said two words—"That too."

Reception

Despite the success of his best-selling novels and nationwide recognition on the cover of Time, Price has received a lesser degree of recognition than many of his contemporaries in American literature. James Schiff explains, "Despite the praise from reviewers, Price has not received a great deal of scholarly attention – certainly less than other members of his literary generation, such as John Updike, Philip Roth, Thomas Pynchon, Joyce Carol Oates, Toni Morrison, John Barth, Sylvia Plath, Susan Sontag, Don DeLillo, and Cynthia Ozick." But although he is less well-known than such writers, Price is widely celebrated by the literary community and the majority of his readers.

List of publications
 A Long and Happy Life (1962)
 The Names and Faces of Heroes (1963)
 A Generous Man (1966)
 Love and Work (1968)
 Permanent Errors (1970)
 Things Themselves (1972)
 The Surface of Earth (1975) 
 Early Dark (1977)
 A Palpable God (1978)
 A Final Letter, published by Sylvester & Orphanos (1980) 
 The Source of Light (1981) 
 Vital Provisions (1982)
 Mustian (1983)
 Private Contentment (1984)
 Kate Vaiden (1986)
 The Laws of Ice (poems, 1986)
 A Common Room (1987)
 Good Hearts (1988)
 Clear Pictures (1989)
 The Tongues of Angels (1990)
 The Use of Fire (1990)
 New Music (1990)
 The Foreseeable Future (1991)
 Blue Calhoun (1992)
 Full Moon (1993)
 The Collected Stories (1993)
 A Whole New Life (1994)
 The Promise of Rest (1995)
 Three Gospels (1996)
 The Collected Poems (1997)
 Roxanna Slade (1998)
 Letter to a Man in the Fire: Does God Exist and Does He Care? (1999)
 A Singular Family: Rosacoke and Her Kin (1999)
 Feasting the Heart (2000)
 Learning a Trade: A Craftsman's Notebooks, 1955-1997 (2000)
 A Perfect Friend (2000)
 Noble Norfleet (2002)
 A Serious Way of Wondering: The Ethics of Jesus Imagined (2003)
 The Good Priest's Son (2005)
 Letter to a Godchild : Concerning Faith (2006)
 Literary Genius: 25 Classic Writers Who Define English & American Literature (2007) (Illustrated by Barry Moser)
 Ardent Spirits: Leaving Home, Coming Back (2009)
 Midstream: An Unfinished Memoir (2012)

References

External links

Price's Duke University page
New York Times reviews of Price's books
Review of Price's Collected Poems
StorySouth review of Price's Collected Stories
'Ralph' magazine review of Price's memoir 
Sensual in the South Edmund White on Price from The New York Review of Books
Obituary of Reynolds Price by the Rhodes Trust
Profile on PBS Religion and Ethics Newsweekly January 21, 2011
Appreciation on Charlie Rose
Interview on 2009 on Charlie Rose Show

1933 births
2011 deaths
20th-century American essayists
21st-century American essayists
20th-century American novelists
21st-century American novelists
People from Macon, North Carolina
Alumni of Merton College, Oxford
American male novelists
American Rhodes Scholars
Duke University alumni
Duke University faculty
Members of the American Academy of Arts and Letters
Novelists from North Carolina
Lambda Literary Award winners
American gay writers
American LGBT dramatists and playwrights
LGBT people from North Carolina
American LGBT poets
American LGBT novelists
People with paraplegia
20th-century American poets
20th-century American dramatists and playwrights
21st-century American poets
American male poets
American male essayists
American male dramatists and playwrights
Needham B. Broughton High School alumni
Writers of American Southern literature
Gay memoirists
Gay poets